Canons Park is a London Underground station at Canons Park of the London Borough of Harrow, north London. It is on the Jubilee line, between Stanmore and Queensbury stations and is in Travelcard Zone 5. It is also the least used station on the Jubilee line with an average of 1.68 million passengers per year.

History
The station was opened on 10 December 1932 by the Metropolitan Railway (MR) on the MR's extension from Wembley Park to Stanmore. The station was originally named Canons Park (Edgware) although the suffix was dropped the following year. On 20 November 1939, services on the Stanmore branch were transferred to the Bakerloo line and, on 1 May 1979, they were transferred again to the Jubilee line.

Ticket office closure
London Underground Limited announced in June 2007 that due to reduced demand for tickets bought from ticket offices (as opposed to from machines) around 40 of the most lightly used ticket offices at Tube stations, including Canons Park, would close from March 2008.

Services and connections
Train frequencies vary throughout the day, but generally operate every 2–6 minutes between 06:08 and 00:17 in both directions.

London Bus routes 79, 186 and 340 serve the station.

References

External links

 London Transport Museum Photographic Archive
 
 
 

Jubilee line stations
London Underground Night Tube stations
Tube stations in the London Borough of Harrow
Former Metropolitan Railway stations
Railway stations in Great Britain opened in 1932